Olivia Hallisey is an American scientist at Stanford University. Previously, she attended Greenwich High School in Greenwich, Connecticut. While a junior in high school, she won first prize in the 2015 Google Science Fair for inventing a low-cost, rapid test for Ebola. The prize also came with $50,000. According to Hallisey, her test can be completed in as little as 30 minutes at a cost of $25, and, unlike existing ebola detection methods, does not require refrigeration. She became interested in fighting Ebola while watching the 2014 West Africa Ebola outbreak in which thousands of people died.

References

  Heather Won Tesoriero, The Class: A Life-Changing Teacher, His World-Changing Kids, and the Most Inventive Classroom in America (2018) has several chapters on her high school career.  excerpt

People from Greenwich, Connecticut
Living people
American women scientists
Year of birth missing (living people)
Greenwich High School alumni
Stanford University alumni
21st-century American women